Lofra (stylized in capital letters in its logo) is an Italian company that manufactures home appliances, freestanding cookers, and built-in ovens and hobs, based in Torreglia in the province of Padua.

History 
Founded in 1956 by brothers Lovato (hence the name LOvato-FRAtelli) in Padova began working producing pots with remnants of war materials.
In subsequent years it started to produce the first heating and wood stoves and  finally get to the gas cookers in stainless steel. For a short time, it also produced camping stoves.

From the 80s to nowadays the company has produced other than gas ranges cookers, built in hobs and ovens both gas and electric and cooker hoods.
Since the beginning of 2010 the company has grown to a new property managed by an Iranian multinational .

Since 2012, after nearly 60 years of production at the historic plant in Teolo, production was transferred to Torreglia, town at the foot of the Euganean Hills.

Other Activities 
During the years 70-80, Lofra besides home appliances produced also prefabricated houses and accessories for the kitchen.

General Company 
In the past Lofra production was concentrated in Italy in 3 establishments, 2 production and a warehouse of finished products.

Since 2010, as a result of societal problems the company was acquired by a new owner, the historical site was abandoned and now everything is concentrated in a single plant in Torreglia (PD).

Know-How Business 
In the past years Lofra has partnered with Designers, launching products with particular aesthetic lines curved shaped.

Awards and recognition
Lofra sponsors sports events at local level; running, cycling, rugby and volleyball teams.

In 1989 it was awarded of the " Ercole D'oro"; international award in innovation technology.

See also

List of Italian companies

References 

 http://www.hapl.com.au/Lofra.htm
 https://web.archive.org/web/20150401135124/http://www.kooklux.nl/fornuizen/lofra-italiaanse-fornuizen
 http://www.keihome.it/brand/lofra/
 https://www.bloomberg.com/research/stocks/private/snapshot.asp?privcapId=46333102

External links 
° Lofra

Companies based in Padua
Home appliance brands
Home appliance manufacturers of Italy
Electronics companies established in 1956
Italian brands
Italian  companies established in 1956